Class 80 may refer to:

British Rail Class 80
DRG Class 80, a class of 39 German 0-6-0T steam locomotive
NIR Class 80, a diesel-electric multiple unit of the Northern Ireland Railways
New South Wales 80 class locomotive, an Australian diesel locomotive

See also
Type 80 (disambiguation)